San Juan Ixhuatepec is a town located in the municipality of Tlalnepantla de Baz, in the centre of the State of Mexico. The population is 353,300. The name of Ixhuatepec means "place in the leaves hill" in the Nahuatl language.

See also
San Juanico disaster

Populated places in the State of Mexico
Tlalnepantla de Baz